Yaw Maama Afful (born June 10, 1959) is a Ghanaian politician and member of the Fifth and  Seventh Parliament of the Fourth Republic of Ghana representing the Jaman South Constituency in the Brong-Ahafo Region on the ticket of the New Patriotic Party.

Early life and education 
Afful was born on June 10, 1959. He hails from Mpuasu, a town in the Brong Ahafo Region of Ghana. He entered Kennesaw State University, Atlanta, USA and obtained his Bachelor of Arts degree in International Affairs and Political Science in 1997.

Career 
Afful was the CEO of EO, Kids Heaven Learning Centre in Aworth, Atlanta in the US. He is a businessman.

Politics 
Afful is a member of the New Patriotic Party (NPP). In 2008, he was elected on the ticket of the New Patriotic Party as the Member of Parliament for the Jaman South Constituency. He thus represented the constituency in the 5th parliament of the 4th republic of Ghana. He was elected with 16,878votes out of the 30,266 valid votes cast equivalent to 55.77% of total valid votes cast. He won against Ofori Aikins of the People's National Convention, Peter Kwabena Ankomah of the National Democratic Congress, Jacob Oteng-Ahyemang of the Convention People's Party and Kwadwo Boakye Djan an independent candidate. These obtained 0.75%, 34.27%, 0.44% and 8.77% respectively of total valid votes cast. He contested again for the Jaman South North seat on the ticket of the NPP for the Member of Parliament seat in the sixth parliament of the fourth republic and won.

Personal life 
Afful is a Christian (Presbyterian). He is married (with three children).

References

Ghanaian MPs 2017–2021
1959 births
Living people
New Patriotic Party politicians